Yorkshire is an unincorporated community in Harrison County, in the U.S. state of Iowa.

History
Yorkshire was founded with the arrival of the Chicago, Milwaukee and St. Paul Railroad. Yorkshire was platted in June 1872 by the railroad company and a store was built soon thereafter. Yorkshire was the stop between Persia, Iowa, and Neola, Iowa. The Yorkshire Post Office opened on November 3, 1885, and a number of businesses soon followed.

Yorkshire's population was 25 in 1887, 30 in 1902, and 34 in 1925.

On June 3, 1925, a pair of tornadoes, estimated at F4 (possibly F5) intensity on the Fujita scale, struck Yorkshire and nearby Persia. The damage was widespread in both communities, and in Yorkshire, the community "lost a depot, local store, church, schoolhouse and a number of residential homes." An infant was killed near Persia.

The Yorkshire Post Office closed on October 30, 1943.

References

Unincorporated communities in Harrison County, Iowa
Unincorporated communities in Iowa